The Hasty Pudding Woman of the Year award is bestowed annually by the Hasty Pudding Theatricals society at Harvard University. The award was created in 1951, and its first recipient was Gertrude Lawrence, an English actress, singer, and dancer. It has since been awarded annually by the society members of the Hasty Pudding to performers deemed to have made a "lasting and impressive contribution to the world of entertainment".

The Woman of the Year recipient is traditionally treated to a day of celebrations in her honor, including a parade through Harvard Square accompanied by members of the Hasty Pudding Theatricals and Pudding-affiliated Organizations. This is usually followed by a celebratory dinner and entertainment by the Harvard Krokodiloes.

Below is a list of the women who have received the award:

Woman of the Year recipients

See also
 Hasty Pudding Man of the Year

References

External links
 Hasty Pudding Man and Woman of the Year

Harvard University
Lists of women
1951 establishments in the United States
Awards established in 1951